Sigrid Schmitz (born 1961, Aachen, Germany) is a visiting professor at the Humboldt University of Berlin, and was formerly the chair of gender studies and scientific head of the Gender Research Office [Referat Genderforschung] at the University of Vienna. Schmitz is also a member of The NeuroGenderings Network.

Education 
Schmitz gained her PhD in behavioral physiology from the Department of Biology, University of Marburg in 1992.

Research 
Schmitz main areas of research are gender and science technology studies with a particular focus in brain sciences and contemporary neurocultures.

Books

See also 
 Cognitive neuroscience
 Gender essentialism
 Neuroscience of sex differences

References

External links 
 Official website

1961 births
German cognitive neuroscientists
Academic staff of the Humboldt University of Berlin
University of Marburg alumni
Academic staff of the University of Vienna
German women neuroscientists
Living people